Richard Enderlin (January 11, 1843 – February 11, 1930) was a musician and United States Army soldier who received a Medal of Honor for the heroism he displayed when fighting in the Battle of Gettysburg in 1863.

Gettysburg
Enderlin was born in Germany and grew up in Chillicothe, Ohio. He enlisted in the Army in November 1861. Enderlin thought his unit was not directly engaged, so the bugler voluntarily joined the defense of Cemetery Ridge.  On July 2, during combat, George Nixon III (the grandfather of American President Richard Nixon) was mortally wounded and was carried out of harm's way by Enderlin. For this action, he was promoted to sergeant the next day, and received the Medal of Honor on September 11, 1897.

Enderlin was later wounded in his right foot at the Battle of Dallas, and served in the Veteran Reserve Corps until his discharge in May 1865.

Enderlin is buried at Grandview Cemetery, Chillicothe, Ross County, Ohio, US.

Medal of Honor citation
Rank and organization: Musician, Company B, 73d Ohio Infantry. Place and date: At Gettysburg, Pa., 1-July 3, 1863. Entered service at: Chillicothe, Ohio. Birth: Germany. Date of issue: September 11, 1897.

Citation:

The President of the United States of America, in the name of Congress, takes pleasure in presenting the Medal of Honor to Musician Richard Enderlin, United States Army, for extraordinary heroism from 1 to 3 July 1863, while serving with Company B, 73d Ohio Infantry, in action at Gettysburg, Pennsylvania. Musician Enderlin voluntarily took a rifle and served as a soldier in the ranks during the first and second days of the battle. Voluntarily and at his own imminent peril went into the enemy's lines at night and, under a sharp fire, rescued a wounded comrade.

See also
List of Medal of Honor recipients for the Battle of Gettysburg
List of American Civil War Medal of Honor recipients: A–F

Notes

References

  
  Hurst, Samuel H. Journal-History of the Seventy-Third Ohio Volunteer Infantry (Chillicothe, OH:  S. H. Hurst), 1866.

External links
 Ohio in the Civil War: 73rd Ohio Volunteer Infantry by Larry Stevens
 National flag of the 73rd Ohio Veteran Volunteer Infantry
 73rd Ohio Infantry monument at Gettysburg
Ohio Medal of Honor Recipients

1843 births
1930 deaths
United States Army Medal of Honor recipients
German emigrants to the United States
United States Army soldiers
People of Ohio in the American Civil War
People from Chillicothe, Ohio
German-born Medal of Honor recipients
American Civil War recipients of the Medal of Honor
Military personnel from Baden-Württemberg